Mbarek El Filali (born 1955 – died 27 November 2021) was a Moroccan footballer who played as a defender for MC Oujda as well as the Moroccan national team.

Career 
El Filali won a Botola title with MC Oujda in 1975 as well as 3rd place with the Moroccan national team at the 1980 African Cup of Nations.

El Filali also played with multiple French teams including Périgueux Foot and Trélissac FC.

He was known to the Moroccan public by the nickname "El Filali Sghir" in order to distinguish him from his older brother Mohamed, another footballer who played for Morocco in the 1970 FIFA World Cup.

Death 
El Filali died on 27 November 2021 in France, following a long illness. Former players of Trélissac FC and the Moroccan national team met in June 2022 to play in a friendly game in tribute to El Filali.

References 

1955 births

2021 deaths
Moroccan footballers
Morocco international footballers
1980 African Cup of Nations players
Botola players
Association football defenders